The Naked Pilgrim is documentary series produced by British broadcaster Five and presented by art critic Brian Sewell.  First broadcast in 2003, the series follows Sewell on the Catholic pilgrimage to Santiago de Compostela.

The series, ostensibly an arts travelogue about the pilgrimage route, was notable for Sewell wrestling with his own loss of faith and for his emotional responses to the pilgrims he encountered.  Each episode features a leg of the pilgrimage route with a diversion in the third episode to visit the shrine at Lourdes.

The series was a success for Five and was watched by more than one million people - the channel's biggest audience for an arts programme.

The series won the prestigious Sandford St. Martin Trust award for Best Religious Programme.  It was released on DVD in 2004.

Locations 

Episode 1
Paris - Sainte Chapelle, Sacré-Cœur, Montmartre, Notre Dame de Paris

Episode 2
Chartres, Pons, Orléans

Episode 3
Bordeaux, Poitiers, Lourdes

Episode 4
Roncesvalles, Bermeo, Guernica, Bilbao

Episode 5
Burgos, Fromista, León

Episode 6
Santiago de Compostela

External links

Critical Reception
The Guardian,  "Sewell bares body and soul for Five" (TV Preview), Ciar Byrne, 19 June 2003.
The Guardian, "The life of Brian" (TV Review), 2 July 2003 (paragraphs 1-5).
The Guardian, "My kingdom for a hearse" (TV Review), Nancy Banks-Smith, 22 July 2003 (paragraphs 6-11).
London Evening Standard, "Anguish of the TV presenter," Brian Sewell, 1 July 2003. (version archived 6 June 2011)  
New Statesman review
The Scotsman, "Not so much the Naked Pilgrim as the haughty hagiographer" (review), 30 June 2003.
The Scotsman, "Naked brilliance of braying Brian" (review), 2 July 2003 (paragraphs 1-7).
Times review (1) (logon required)
Times review (2) (logon required)
Times best television programmes of 2003 (logon required)

Channel 5 (British TV channel) original programming
Television shows about Catholicism
2003 British television series debuts
2003 British television series endings